Region X (Spanish: Región X. Tejupilco) is a Mexican intrastate region within the State of Mexico, one of 16. It borders the states of Guerrero and Michoacán in the southwest corner of the state. The region comprises four municipalities: Amatepec,
Luvianos, 
Tejupilco,
Tlatlaya.  It is largely rural.

References

Regions of the State of Mexico